Cholo Potol Tuly is a Bengali comedy drama film directed by Arindam Ganguly and produced by Shanoli Majumder. This film was released on 21 October 2020 under the banner of Pastel Entertainment. The film inspired by a popular Bengali stage play, based on eponymous story of Shibram Chakraborty, Ashwathama Hato Iti.

Plot
Ashwini Chakladar, a crazy person thinks that he may be affected from BeriBeri disease through his neighbour. As a protective measure he eats peel of banana regularly. Chakladar gets paranoid and makes trouble in his family that leads to comical situations.

Cast
 Sabyasachi Chakrabarty as Ashwini
 Kheyali Dastidar as Jagottarini
 Arindam Ganguly as Doctor
 Gaurav Chakrabarty as Mainak
 Debshankar Haldar
 Aparajita Adhya
 Paran Bandyopadhyay
 Biswanath Basu
 Kanchan Mullick
 Subhasish Mukherjee
 Kharaj Mukherjee as Binod
 Sanjoy Sarkar

References

2020 films
Films based on Indian novels
Indian comedy-drama films
Bengali-language Indian films
2020s Bengali-language films

External links